There are at least 15 named lakes and reservoirs in Mississippi County, Arkansas.

Lakes
	Caney Old River, el.  
	Crooked Lake, el.  
	Half Moon Lake, el.  
	Long Lake, el.  
	Mink Lake, el.  
	Preston Lake, el.  
	Sky Lake, el.  
	Snake Lake, el.  
	Stave Lake, el.  
	Swan Lake, el.  
	The Chute, el.  
	Tupelo Lake, el.  
	West Bayou, el.  
	Woods Lake, el.

Reservoir
	Mallard Lake, el.

See also

 List of lakes in Arkansas

Notes

Bodies of water of Mississippi County, Arkansas
Mississippi